Hori (written:  or ) is a Japanese surname. Notable people with the surname include:

, Japanese writer
, Japanese artist
, Japanese samurai
, Japanese voice actor
, Japanese kickboxer
, Japanese ice hockey player
, Japanese actress and voice actress
, Japanese footballer
, Japanese baseball player
, Japanese politician
, Japanese ice hockey player
, Japanese idol & model, member of Japanese girl group Nogizaka46
, Japanese samurai
, Japanese footballer
, Japanese dollmaker
Shigeyuki Hori, Japanese automotive engineer
, Japanese footballer and manager
, Japanese writer, poet and translator
, Japanese politician
, Imperial Japanese Navy admiral
, Japanese chief executive
, Japanese voice actor

Fictional characters
, main character from Dig Dug
, main character from Mr. Driller
, character from Mr. Driller
, main character from Horimiya
, character from Monthly Girls' Nozaki-kun

Japanese-language surnames